The 1996–97 NBA season was the 9th season for the Charlotte Hornets in the National Basketball Association. For the first time since the 1990–91 season, Larry Johnson was not on the team's opening day roster. The Hornets had the 13th pick in the 1996 NBA draft, and selected high school basketball star Kobe Bryant, but soon traded him to the Los Angeles Lakers in exchange for Vlade Divac, acquired Anthony Mason from the New York Knicks, and signed free agent Tony Smith during the off-season. The team also hired former Boston Celtics star Dave Cowens as their new head coach. 

Under Cowens, and with the addition of Divac and Mason, the new-look Hornets played better than expected. After an 8–9 start to the season, the Hornets won 21 of their next 31 games, holding a 29–19 record at the All-Star break. At midseason, the team signed free agent and former All-Star forward Tom Chambers in January, then traded Scott Burrell, second-year guard Anthony Goldwire, and second-year center George Zidek to the Golden State Warriors, and acquired Ricky Pierce from the Denver Nuggets in February. However, Chambers was released to free agency after 12 games. The Hornets posted a nine-game winning streak in April, and finished fourth in the Central Division with a franchise best record at 54–28, making it back to the playoffs after a one-year absence.

Glen Rice had the finest season of his career, finishing third in the league in scoring with a career-high of 26.8 points per game, earning All-NBA Second Team honors, and finishing in fifth place in Most Valuable Player voting. Rice was also selected for the 1997 NBA All-Star Game, where he set several scoring records and was selected the game's MVP. In addition, Mason averaged 16.2 points, 11.4 rebounds and 5.7 assists per game, and earned All-NBA Third Team and NBA All-Defensive Second Team honors, while Divac and Matt Geiger both provided the best center combo in the league, as Divac averaged 12.6 points, 9.0 rebounds, 1.3 steals and 2.2 blocks per game, and Geiger provided the team with 8.9 points and 5.3 rebounds per game, but only played just 49 games due to a back injury. Sixth man Dell Curry contributed 14.8 points per game off the bench, while Muggsy Bogues provided with 8.0 points, 7.2 assists and 1.3 steals per game, and Smith contributed 5.0 points per game. Cowens finished in second place in Coach of the Year voting.

However, in the Eastern Conference First Round of the playoffs, the Hornets were swept by the New York Knicks in three straight games. The Hornets led the NBA in home-game attendance for the eighth, and final time during their history in Charlotte. They also had the best three-point percentage in NBA history shooting 42.8% from beyond the arch. Following the season, Pierce re-signed as a free agent with his former team, the Milwaukee Bucks during the next season, and Smith was released to free agency.

NBA Draft

In the 1996 NBA Draft, the Hornets selected Kobe Bryant with the 13th overall pick.  Before he was chosen by the Hornets, the 17-year-old Bryant had made a lasting impression on then-Lakers general manager Jerry West, who immediately foresaw potential in Bryant's basketball ability during pre-draft workouts.  West even went on to state that Bryant's workouts were some of the best he had seen. Immediately after the draft, Dave Cowens expressed that the Hornets had no use for him. Fifteen days later, West traded his starting center, Vlade Divac to the Hornets for the young Kobe Bryant.

Roster

Roster Notes
 Power forward Tom Chambers was waived on April 8.

Regular season

Season standings

Record vs. opponents

Game log

Regular season

|- align="center" bgcolor="#ccffcc"
| 1
| November 2, 1996
| Toronto
| W 109–98
|
|
|
| Charlotte Coliseum
| 1–0
|- align="center" bgcolor="#ffcccc"
| 2
| November 3, 1996
| @ New York
| L 86–113
|
|
|
| Madison Square Garden
| 1–1
|- align="center" bgcolor="#ccffcc"
| 3
| November 6, 1996
| L.A. Lakers
| W 88–78
|
|
|
| Charlotte Coliseum
| 2–1
|- align="center" bgcolor="#ccffcc"
| 4
| November 8, 1996
| @ Washington
| W 102–87
|
|
|
| US Airways Arena
| 3–1
|- align="center" bgcolor="#ffcccc"
| 5
| November 9, 1996
| Milwaukee
| L 98–100
|
|
|
| Charlotte Coliseum
| 3–2
|- align="center" bgcolor="#ffcccc"
| 6
| November 12, 1996
| @ Miami
| L 72–93
|
|
|
| Miami Arena
| 3–3
|- align="center" bgcolor="#ffcccc"
| 7
| November 14, 1996
| @ Orlando
| L 89–96
|
|
|
| Orlando Arena
| 3–4
|- align="center" bgcolor="#ffcccc"
| 8
| November 15, 1996
| Chicago
| L 87–110
|
|
|
| Charlotte Coliseum
| 3–5
|- align="center" bgcolor="#ccffcc"
| 9
| November 20, 1996
| New York
| W 93–86
|
|
|
| Charlotte Coliseum
| 4–5
|- align="center" bgcolor="#ccffcc"
| 10
| November 21, 1996
| @ Indiana
| W 90–87
|
|
|
| Market Square Arena
| 5–5
|- align="center" bgcolor="#ccffcc"
| 11
| November 23, 1996
| Detroit
| W 93–85
|
|
|
| Charlotte Coliseum
| 6–5
|- align="center" bgcolor="#ccffcc"
| 12
| November 26, 1996
| Seattle
| W 97–89
|
|
|
| Charlotte Coliseum
| 7–5
|- align="center" bgcolor="#ffcccc"
| 13
| November 27, 1996
| @ Toronto
| L 88–92
|
|
|
| SkyDome
| 7–6
|- align="center" bgcolor="#ccffcc"
| 14
| November 30, 1996
| @ Milwaukee
| W 94–87
|
|
|
| Bradley Center
| 8–6

|- align="center" bgcolor="#ffcccc"
| 15
| December 2, 1996
| @ Utah
| L 97–107
|
|
|
| Delta Center
| 8–7
|- align="center" bgcolor="#ffcccc"
| 16
| December 3, 1996
| @ L.A. Clippers
| L 89–96
|
|
|
| Los Angeles Memorial Sports Arena
| 8–8
|- align="center" bgcolor="#ffcccc"
| 17
| December 6, 1996
| @ Portland
| L 93–97
|
|
|
| Rose Garden Arena
| 8–9
|- align="center" bgcolor="#ccffcc"
| 18
| December 7, 1996
| @ Seattle
| W 94–92
|
|
|
| KeyArena
| 9–9
|- align="center" bgcolor="#ccffcc"
| 19
| December 9, 1996
| @ Vancouver
| W 107–91
|
|
|
| General Motors Place
| 10–9
|- align="center" bgcolor="#ccffcc"
| 20
| December 11, 1996
| Denver
| W 101–97
|
|
|
| Charlotte Coliseum
| 11–9
|- align="center" bgcolor="#ccffcc"
| 21
| December 13, 1996
| Philadelphia
| W 84–75
|
|
|
| Charlotte Coliseum
| 12–9
|- align="center" bgcolor="#ffcccc"
| 22
| December 14, 1996
| @ Chicago
| L 82–87
|
|
|
| United Center
| 12–10
|- align="center" bgcolor="#ccffcc"
| 23
| December 17, 1996
| @ Philadelphia
| W 93–84
|
|
|
| CoreStates Center
| 13–10
|- align="center" bgcolor="#ffcccc"
| 24
| December 19, 1996
| Chicago
| L 72–93
|
|
|
| Charlotte Coliseum
| 13–11
|- align="center" bgcolor="#ccffcc"
| 25
| December 21, 1996
| Atlanta
| W 98–93
|
|
|
| Charlotte Coliseum
| 14–11
|- align="center" bgcolor="#ccffcc"
| 26
| December 22, 1996
| @ Boston
| W 102–98
|
|
|
| FleetCenter
| 15–11
|- align="center" bgcolor="#ffcccc"
| 27
| December 27, 1996
| Miami
| L 86–101
|
|
|
| Charlotte Coliseum
| 15–12
|- align="center" bgcolor="#ffcccc"
| 28
| December 28, 1996
| @ Detroit
| L 75–97
|
|
|
| The Palace of Auburn Hills
| 15–13
|- align="center" bgcolor="#ccffcc"
| 29
| December 30, 1996
| @ Washington
| W 101–92
|
|
|
| US Airways Arena
| 16–13

|- align="center" bgcolor="#ccffcc"
| 30
| January 2, 1997
| Dallas
| W 107–97
|
|
|
| Charlotte Coliseum
| 17–13
|- align="center" bgcolor="#ffcccc"
| 31
| January 4, 1997
| Washington
| L 93–104
|
|
|
| Charlotte Coliseum
| 17–14
|- align="center" bgcolor="#ccffcc"
| 32
| January 6, 1997
| @ Golden State
| W 109–101
|
|
|
| San Jose Arena
| 18–14
|- align="center" bgcolor="#ffcccc"
| 33
| January 8, 1997
| @ L.A. Lakers
| L 97–101
|
|
|
| Great Western Forum
| 18–15
|- align="center" bgcolor="#ffcccc"
| 34
| January 10, 1997
| @ Phoenix
| L 90–102
|
|
|
| America West Arena
| 18–16
|- align="center" bgcolor="#ccffcc"
| 35
| January 12, 1997
| @ Sacramento
| W 97–93
|
|
|
| ARCO Arena
| 19–16
|- align="center" bgcolor="#ccffcc"
| 36
| January 13, 1997
| @ Denver
| W 102–100 (OT)
|
|
|
| McNichols Sports Arena
| 20–16
|- align="center" bgcolor="#ccffcc"
| 37
| January 15, 1997
| New Jersey
| W 116–104
|
|
|
| Charlotte Coliseum
| 21–16
|- align="center" bgcolor="#ccffcc"
| 38
| January 18, 1997
| @ New Jersey
| W 102–92
|
|
|
| Continental Airlines Arena
| 22–16
|- align="center" bgcolor="#ffcccc"
| 39
| January 20, 1997
| @ Atlanta
| L 97–106
|
|
|
| The Omni
| 22–17
|- align="center" bgcolor="#ccffcc"
| 40
| January 21, 1997
| Houston
| W 114–108
|
|
|
| Charlotte Coliseum
| 23–17
|- align="center" bgcolor="#ccffcc"
| 41
| January 24, 1997
| New York
| W 113–104 (OT)
|
|
|
| Charlotte Coliseum
| 24–17
|- align="center" bgcolor="#ffcccc"
| 42
| January 25, 1997
| @ Cleveland
| L 73–106
|
|
|
| Gund Arena
| 24–18
|- align="center" bgcolor="#ccffcc"
| 43
| January 28, 1997
| @ Indiana
| W 98–97
|
|
|
| Market Square Arena
| 25–18
|- align="center" bgcolor="#ffcccc"
| 44
| January 29, 1997
| Indiana
| L 95–106
|
|
|
| Charlotte Coliseum
| 25–19
|- align="center" bgcolor="#ccffcc"
| 45
| January 31, 1997
| Milwaukee
| W 102–95
|
|
|
| Charlotte Coliseum
| 26–19

|- align="center" bgcolor="#ccffcc"
| 46
| February 2, 1997
| @ New York
| W 99–93
|
|
|
| Madison Square Garden
| 27–19
|- align="center" bgcolor="#ccffcc"
| 47
| February 4, 1997
| Minnesota
| W 115–101
|
|
|
| Charlotte Coliseum
| 28–19
|- align="center" bgcolor="#ccffcc"
| 48
| February 6, 1997
| Sacramento
| W 115–100
|
|
|
| Charlotte Coliseum
| 29–19
|- align="center"
|colspan="9" bgcolor="#bbcaff"|All-Star Break
|- style="background:#cfc;"
|- bgcolor="#bbffbb"
|- align="center" bgcolor="#ffcccc"
| 49
| February 11, 1997
| @ Chicago
| L 100–103
|
|
|
| United Center
| 29–20
|- align="center" bgcolor="#ccffcc"
| 50
| February 12, 1997
| New Jersey
| W 113–100
|
|
|
| Charlotte Coliseum
| 30–20
|- align="center" bgcolor="#ffcccc"
| 51
| February 14, 1997
| Detroit
| L 103–109
|
|
|
| Charlotte Coliseum
| 30–21
|- align="center" bgcolor="#ccffcc"
| 52
| February 17, 1997
| Orlando
| W 124–110
|
|
|
| Charlotte Coliseum
| 31–21
|- align="center" bgcolor="#ccffcc"
| 53
| February 19, 1997
| Phoenix
| W 123–115
|
|
|
| Charlotte Coliseum
| 32–21
|- align="center" bgcolor="#ccffcc"
| 54
| February 21, 1997
| L.A. Clippers
| W 114–96
|
|
|
| Charlotte Coliseum
| 33–21
|- align="center" bgcolor="#ccffcc"
| 55
| February 22, 1997
| @ Atlanta
| W 93–92
|
|
|
| The Omni
| 34–21
|- align="center" bgcolor="#ccffcc"
| 56
| February 24, 1997
| @ San Antonio
| W 96–84
|
|
|
| Alamodome
| 35–21
|- align="center" bgcolor="#ffcccc"
| 57
| February 25, 1997
| @ Dallas
| L 84–86
|
|
|
| Reunion Arena
| 35–22
|- align="center" bgcolor="#ccffcc"
| 58
| February 27, 1997
| @ Houston
| W 106–95
|
|
|
| The Summit
| 36–22

|- align="center" bgcolor="#ccffcc"
| 59
| March 2, 1997
| @ Minnesota
| W 108–96
|
|
|
| Target Center
| 37–22
|- align="center" bgcolor="#ccffcc"
| 60
| March 4, 1997
| San Antonio
| W 105–98
|
|
|
| Charlotte Coliseum
| 38–22
|- align="center" bgcolor="#ccffcc"
| 61
| March 6, 1997
| Boston
| W 122–121 (OT)
|
|
|
| Charlotte Coliseum
| 39–22
|- align="center" bgcolor="#ccffcc"
| 62
| March 9, 1997
| Miami
| W 82–76
|
|
|
| Charlotte Coliseum
| 40–22
|- align="center" bgcolor="#ccffcc"
| 63
| March 11, 1997
| Vancouver
| W 98–92
|
|
|
| Charlotte Coliseum
| 41–22
|- align="center" bgcolor="#ffcccc"
| 64
| March 14, 1997
| @ Orlando
| L 81–86
|
|
|
| Orlando Arena
| 41–23
|- align="center" bgcolor="#ccffcc"
| 65
| March 15, 1997
| @ Philadelphia
| W 107–99
|
|
|
| CoreStates Center
| 42–23
|- align="center" bgcolor="#ffcccc"
| 66
| March 17, 1997
| Utah
| L 93–114
|
|
|
| Charlotte Coliseum
| 42–24
|- align="center" bgcolor="#ccffcc"
| 67
| March 19, 1997
| Cleveland
| W 90–72
|
|
|
| Charlotte Coliseum
| 43–24
|- align="center" bgcolor="#ccffcc"
| 68
| March 21, 1997
| @ Toronto
| W 102–97
|
|
|
| SkyDome
| 44–24
|- align="center" bgcolor="#ccffcc"
| 69
| March 22, 1997
| Golden State
| W 100–93 (OT)
|
|
|
| Charlotte Coliseum
| 45–24
|- align="center" bgcolor="#ffcccc"
| 70
| March 26, 1997
| Portland
| L 87–88
|
|
|
| Charlotte Coliseum
| 45–25
|- align="center" bgcolor="#ffcccc"
| 71
| March 28, 1997
| Indiana
| L 115–116
|
|
|
| Charlotte Coliseum
| 45–26

|- align="center" bgcolor="#ccffcc"
| 72
| April 2, 1997
| Atlanta
| W 95–84
|
|
|
| Charlotte Coliseum
| 46–26
|- align="center" bgcolor="#ccffcc"
| 73
| April 3, 1997
| @ New Jersey
| W 93–87
|
|
|
| Continental Airlines Arena
| 47–26
|- align="center" bgcolor="#ccffcc"
| 74
| April 5, 1997
| Philadelphia
| W 115–113
|
|
|
| Charlotte Coliseum
| 48–26
|- align="center" bgcolor="#ccffcc"
| 75
| April 7, 1997
| @ Cleveland
| W 110–105 (OT)
|
|
|
| Gund Arena
| 49–26
|- align="center" bgcolor="#ccffcc"
| 76
| April 9, 1997
| Boston
| W 136–111
|
|
|
| Charlotte Coliseum
| 50–26
|- align="center" bgcolor="#ccffcc"
| 77
| April 11, 1997
| @ Detroit
| W 93–85
|
|
|
| The Palace of Auburn Hills
| 51–26
|- align="center" bgcolor="#ccffcc"
| 78
| April 12, 1997
| Washington
| W 99–97
|
|
|
| Charlotte Coliseum
| 52–26
|- align="center" bgcolor="#ccffcc"
| 79
| April 14, 1997
| Cleveland
| W 94–82
|
|
|
| Charlotte Coliseum
| 53–26
|- align="center" bgcolor="#ccffcc"
| 80
| April 16, 1997
| @ Boston
| W 108–102
|
|
|
| FleetCenter
| 54–26
|- align="center" bgcolor="#ffcccc"
| 81
| April 18, 1997
| Toronto
| L 100–108
|
|
|
| Charlotte Coliseum
| 54–27
|- align="center" bgcolor="#ffcccc"
| 82
| April 20, 1997
| @ Milwaukee
| L 100–120
|
|
|
| Bradley Center
| 54–28

Playoffs

|- align="center" bgcolor="#ffcccc"
| 1
| April 24, 1997
| @ New York
| L 99–109
| Vlade Divac (27)
| Anthony Mason (13)
| Anthony Mason (5)
| Madison Square Garden19,763
| 0–1
|- align="center" bgcolor="#ffcccc"
| 2
| April 26, 1997
| @ New York
| L 93–100
| Glen Rice (39)
| Divac, Mason (12)
| four players tied (2)
| Madison Square Garden19,763
| 0–2
|- align="center" bgcolor="#ffcccc"
| 3
| April 28, 1997
| New York
| L 95–104
| Glen Rice (22)
| Anthony Mason (11)
| Glen Rice (9)
| Charlotte Coliseum24,042
| 0–3
|-

Player statistics

Season

Playoffs

Awards and records
 Glen Rice, NBA All-Star Game Most Valuable Player Award 
 Bob Bass, NBA Executive of the Year Award
 Glen Rice, All-NBA Second Team
 Anthony Mason, All-NBA Third Team
 Anthony Mason, NBA All-Defensive Second Team

Transactions
 July 11, 1996

Released Michael Adams.

Traded Kobe Bryant to the Los Angeles Lakers for Vlade Divac.

Released Robert Parish.
 July 14, 1996

Traded Larry Johnson to the New York Knicks for Brad Lohaus and Anthony Mason.
 October 3, 1996

Signed Bob McCann as a free agent.

October 19, 1996

Signed Tony Smith as a free agent.
 October 31, 1996

Waived Brad Lohaus.
 January 6, 1997

Signed Jamie Feick to the first of two 10-day contracts.
 January 28, 1997

Signed Eric Leckner to a 10-day contract.
 January 30, 1997

Signed Tom Chambers to a contract for the rest of the season.
 February 20, 1997

Traded Scott Burrell to the Golden State Warriors for Donald Royal.

Traded Anthony Goldwire and George Zidek to the Denver Nuggets for Ricky Pierce.
 April 8, 1997

Waived Tom Chambers.

Player Transactions Citation:

References

 Hornets on Database Basketball
 Hornets on Basketball Reference

Charlotte Hornets seasons
Char
Bob
Bob